The Flores-class gunboats were a class of two gunboats built in the mid-1920s for the Royal Netherlands Navy.  and  were intended to patrol the Dutch East Indies. During World War II, they served in the Royal Netherlands Navy. They were in several ways the most successful surface ships of the Dutch navy during the war.

They were squat ships, both commissioned in 1926, with a relatively heavy armament for their size (three  Krupp guns, the same type and calibre as for the cruisers Java and Sumatra).

Construction

Service history
Flores was brought back to the Netherlands at the start of World War II where she patrolled home waters until the Germans invaded in 1940. Slightly damaged, she escaped to Britain and was employed as a coastal escort. Soemba was withdrawn to Colombo in March 1942, before she could be captured or destroyed by the Japanese invasion of the East Indies.

Flores and Soemba were united in the Mediterranean Sea and played an active and successful role in the landings in Sicily,  Salerno, Anzio, Garigliano, Gaeta and finally, at the beaches of Normandy in June 1944. The ships came under fire from shore based artillery and bombers many times, but survived all attacks, although they incurred damage several times. British war correspondents referred to them as "the terrible twins".

With their guns worn out due to intensive use, the two ships were retired from active duty shortly after the war and used for artillery instruction and as floating barracks. Soemba was converted to a radar training ship, most of her guns removed and enlarged superstructure fitted to house radar equipment and classrooms.

Flores was decommissioned in 1968 and Soemba in 1986.

Notes

References

External links
 Detailed history of Flores
 Detailed history of Soemba

World War II sloops of the Netherlands
1925 ships
 
Gunboat classes